Fyodor Fyodorovich Radetsky (Radetzky in German) (1820–1890) was a Russian general of German-Silesian extraction. He founded the city of Krasnovodsk (modern Türkmenbaşy, Turkmenistan) in 1869. He commanded the Russian forces at the 3rd stage (September 13–17, 1877) and 4th stage (January 5–9, 1878) of the Battle of Shipka Pass.

Military career
Non-commissioned officer: 1838
Praporshchik: 1839
Podporuchik: 1844
Poruchik: 1845
Stabskapitän: 1849
Captain: 1850
Colonel: 1857
Major general: 1860
Lieutenant general: 1868
General of the Infantry (Imperial Russia): 1877
Adjutant general: 1878

Awards
  Order of St. Stanislaus, 3rd class (4.8.1845)
  Order of Saint Anna, 3rd class with a bow (16.12.1852)
  Order of Saint Anna, 2nd class with Imperial Crown (18.8.1855, Imperial Crown on 31.1.1859)
  Order of Saint Vladimir, 4th class with a bow (4.10.1855)
  Order of St. George, 4th class (8.9.1859)
  Golden Checker "For Bravery", (10.5.1860)
  Order of Saint Vladimir, 3rd class (5.9.1863)
  Order of St. Stanislaus, 1st class with swords (16.4.1867)
  Order of Saint Anna, 1st with swords and Imperial Crown, (30.8.1870, Imperial Crown on 19.8.1872)
  Order of Saint Vladimir, 2nd class (8.8.1875)
  Order of St. George, 3rd class (16.6.1877)
  Golden Sword with diamonds and the inscription "For the defense of Shipka with 9 to 14 August" (15.8.1877)
  Order of St. George, 2nd class (4.1.1878)
  Order of the White Eagle (Russian Empire), (15.5.1882)
  Order of St. Alexander Nevsky with diamonds signs (30.5.1885, diamonds signs in 1888)
  Order of the Cross of Takovo (Kingdom of Serbia)

References

1820 births
1890 deaths
Russian military personnel of the Russo-Turkish War (1877–1878)
Recipients of the Order of Saint Stanislaus (Russian), 3rd class
Recipients of the Order of St. Anna, 3rd class
Recipients of the Order of St. Anna, 2nd class
Recipients of the Order of St. Vladimir, 4th class
Recipients of the Gold Sword for Bravery
Recipients of the Order of St. Vladimir, 3rd class
Recipients of the Order of Saint Stanislaus (Russian), 1st class
Recipients of the Order of St. Anna, 1st class
Recipients of the Order of St. Vladimir, 2nd class
Recipients of the Order of St. George of the Third Degree
Recipients of the Order of St. George of the Second Degree
Recipients of the Order of the White Eagle (Russia)
Recipients of the Order of the Cross of Takovo
Battle of Shipka Pass